Elizabeth Humphreys Penrose (born December 30, 1960) is an American writer of poetry in the science fiction genre. She is a long-standing member of one of Pittsburgh's oldest Science-Fiction and Fantasy Writer's Workshops, Carnegie-Mellon University-based Pittsburgh Worldwrights, which was founded by Mary Soon Lee and includes Pittsburgh science fiction writers Barton Paul Levenson and Kenneth Chiacchia among its members, see Pittsburgh#Writing. Penrose was raised in Pittsburgh, Pennsylvania. She is a graduate of the University of Pittsburgh with a Bachelor's in English and Master's in English Literature.

Biography
Penrose was born in Wilmington, Delaware in 1960 but was brought to Pittsburgh, Pennsylvania at the age of 2 and has lived there ever since. Elizabeth Penrose is building a list of publications, including her poems in Star*Line, Wicked Hollow and Pedestal Magazine. She teaches a class in poetry reading and writing at a social service agency connected with University of Pittsburgh Medical Centers. She views herself as a Christian Socialist, Feminist, Pacifist.

Bibliography

Poems
"Silence", Voices From the Attic, Anthology, Carlow University Press, Pittsburgh, PA, 2011
"Never", Voices From the Attic, Anthology, Carlow University Press, Pittsburgh PA, 2011
"A Wrong Turn", Asimov's Science Fiction, August 2010
"The Land of the Golden Purse", Beyond Centauri, June 2010
"Hives" Abyss & Apex Issue 27
"To D.M. Pinkwater" Mindflights, 2008 (Out of print) mindflights.com
"Seeing The Dragon" Mindflights, 2008 (Out of print) mindflights.com
"A Pacifist in Wartime" The Pedestal Magazine THE POLITICAL ANTHOLOGY 2004
"An Explanation," Wicked Hollow #December 7, 2003
"The Prince Who Killed A Dragon" EOTU Ezine Volume 4, Issue 2  April 2003
"A Girl's Game" Star*Line Issue 25.3, May/June 2002

Contest wins and accolades
"Scientific Experiment 1927" Judge's Picks W. Gregory Stewart's choices 2008 Science Fiction Poetry Association Contest Winners
"Spring Morning" Nippon 2007 Haiku Contest

References

External links

1960 births
Living people
American science fiction writers
American women poets
Writers from Wilmington, Delaware
Writers from Delaware
Writers from Pittsburgh
Women science fiction and fantasy writers
American women novelists
Novelists from Pennsylvania
21st-century American poets
21st-century American women writers